Lartigue can refer to:

 The Lartigue Monorail system, invented by the French engineer Charles Lartigue (1834–1907)
 Lartigue, Gers, a commune in the Gers département in France
 Lartigue, Gironde, a commune in the Gironde département in France
 Jacques Henri Lartigue (1894–1986), a French photographer and painter
 Jean-Jacques Lartigue, a Montreal bishop who opposed the Patriotes